This is a list of commercial banks in Sudan

 Agricultural Bank of Sudan
 Savings and Social Development Bank
 Industrial Development Bank
 El -Nilien Bank
 Bank of Khartoum
 Real Estates Commercial Bank
 Faisal Islamic Bank
 Sudanese French Bank
 National Bank of Sudan
 Blue Nile Mashreq Bank		
 Sudanese Islamic Bank
 Tadamon Islamic Bank
 Islamic Cooperative Development Bank
 Baraka Bank (Sudan)
 Export Development Bank
 Saudi Sudanese Bank
 Workers’ National Bank
 Animal Resources’ Bank
 Al Shamal Islamic Bank
 Farmer’s Commercial Bank
 Omdurman National Bank
 African Bank for Trade and Development
 Byblos Bank (Africa)
 Alsalam Bank
 Sudanese Egyptian Bank
 United Capital Bank
 Aljazeera Sudanese Jordanian Bank
 Family Bank
 Financial Investment Bank 
 Abu Dhabi National Bank
 Qatar National Bank
 Arab Sudanese Bank

See also
 List of banks in Africa
 List of banks in the Arab world
 Central Bank of Sudan
 Economy of Sudan
 List of companies based in Sudan

References

External links
  Website of Central Bank of Sudan

 
Banks
Sudan
Sudan